Sarmolk (also known as Sar-e Malek and Sar-i-Malīk) is a village in Mashiz Rural District, in the Central District of Bardsir County, Kerman Province, Iran. At the 2006 census, its population was 340, in 86 families.

References 

Populated places in Bardsir County